Zwola may refer to the following places:
Zwola, Garwolin County in Masovian Voivodeship (east-central Poland)
Zwola, Kozienice County in Masovian Voivodeship (east-central Poland)
Zwola, Świętokrzyskie Voivodeship (south-central Poland)
Zwola, Greater Poland Voivodeship (west-central Poland)